Pine Grove Township is a township in Schuylkill County, Pennsylvania, United States. The population was 4,024 at the 2020 census.

History
Swatara Furnace was added to the National Register of Historic Places in 1991.

Geography
According to the United States Census Bureau, the township has a total area of 38.3 square miles (99.3 km2), of which 38.2 square miles (98.9 km2)  is land and 0.2 square mile (0.4 km2)  (0.39%) is water.

Recreation
Portions of the Pennsylvania State Game Lands Number 80 through which passes the Appalachian National Scenic Trail are located in the southern portion of the township, and the western portion of the Sweet Arrow Lake County Park is located along the eastern border of the township.

Demographics

At the 2000 census there were 3,930 people, 1,570 households, and 1,182 families living in the township.  The population density was 102.9 people per square mile (39.7/km2).  There were 1,696 housing units at an average density of 44.4/sq mi (17.1/km2).  The racial makeup of the township was 99.21% White, 0.03% Native American, 0.25% Asian, 0.05% from other races, and 0.46% from two or more races. Hispanic or Latino of any race were 0.33%.

Of the 1,570 households 30.6% had children under the age of 18 living with them, 62.7% were married couples living together, 7.3% had a female householder with no husband present, and 24.7% were non-families. 21.0% of households were one person and 12.0% were one person aged 65 or older.  The average household size was 2.50 and the average family size was 2.87.

The age distribution was 23.2% under the age of 18, 6.1% from 18 to 24, 28.5% from 25 to 44, 24.2% from 45 to 64, and 18.1% 65 or older.  The median age was 40 years. For every 100 females there were 98.2 males.  For every 100 females age 18 and over, there were 95.8 males.

The median household income was $38,933 and the median family income was $42,813. Males had a median income of $32,478 versus $21,707 for females. The per capita income for the township was $17,011.  About 5.3% of families and 6.5% of the population were below the poverty line, including 6.6% of those under age 18 and 6.5% of those age 65 or over.

References

Townships in Schuylkill County, Pennsylvania